The Snow Queen is a 1957 Soviet animated musical fantasy film directed by Lev Atamanov. It was produced by Soyuzmultfilm and is based on the 1844 story of the same name by Hans Christian Andersen. The film is one of the first cinematic adaptations of the Scandinavian Danish fable ever since the story was written by Andersen in New Fairy Tales. First Volume. Second Collection (1844). The film was the ninth full-length animated film from studio Soyuzmultfilm.

The film was released in Russia on November 1, 1957. The film was re-released with English soundtracks in 1959, 1993 and 1995. The film was translated into all major languages: English, German, French, Italian, Spanish and even Swedish. In 1959 at the height of the Cold War, Universal Pictures acquired the film for U.S. theatrical distribution. In the United States, in the 1960s and 70s, it became a good tradition to show The Snow Queen during the December holidays.

In all countries where The Snow Queen was shown, the most popular actors of the country took part in voicing the characters. The Snow Queen was voiced by Russian actress Maria Babanova. Vladimir Gribkov (ru), Yanina Zhejmo, Sergey Martinson and Anna Komolova (ru) also were part of the voice cast.

The screenplay is by Nikolai Erdman, Georgy Grebner (ru) and animation by Alexander Vinokurov (ru), Leonid Shvartsman, Elizabeth Komova, Vladimir Krumin and Fyodor Khitruk. After a 2007 Ghibli Museum Library release in Japan, an interview revealed that the dialogue, compositions, animation and themes of the film influenced Japanese animator Hayao Miyazaki. An HD film restoration re-release of The Snow Queen published in Russia on 19 December 2020 by Soyuzmultfilm.

Plot
Two young children, Kai and Gerda, listen to Gerda's grandmother as she tells them the legend of the Snow Queen. Kai jokes that if he met the Queen, he would put her on a hot stove, and melt her. The Snow Queen, who is watching the children in her magic mirror, becomes angry and smashes the mirror with her scepter. She enchants the ice splinters and sends a big snowstorm over the city. A rush of wind changes Kai's heart turning him cruel towards Gerda.

The next day, Kai ties his sled to the sleigh of the Snow Queen, who takes him into her arms as her willing captive. Gerda sets out for the Snow Queen's palace, determined not to give up until she has brought her friend back. Along the way, she meets a raven, "Mr. Corax" (Ancient Greek for "raven"). Gerda tells him that she is looking for a "good, kind, brave boy". Mr. Corax tells her that such a boy is now living at the palace of a princess. Mr. Corax takes Gerda to the palace to find his fiancée Henrietta, who knows the palace and can guide Gerda through it. The prince turns out not to be Kai, but he and the princess decide to help Gerda. They send Gerda on her way with a golden coach and attendants.

While the coach travels through a dark woods, a gang of robbers takes Gerda and strip the coach of its gold plate. The daughter of the robber chieftain shows Gerda her menagerie, which contains a reindeer from Lapland. The little robber, touched by Gerda's kindness, releases the girl along with the reindeer to search for Kai, and then frees all her captive animals.

Gerda and the reindeer arrive in Lapland, where a Lapp woman tells them that the Snow Queen had stopped there with Kai but went on farther north to Finland. She directs them to her cousin in Finland who can direct them further and writes a letter to her on a fish that she sends with Gerda and the reindeer.

The reindeer is unable to take Gerda up to the ice palace, so Gerda goes on alone. When Gerda finally gets to the palace through the blustery wind and snow, she encounters Kai. Kai rudely asks Gerda to leave, which brings her to tears. She hugs him, and her tears melt the shard of mirror in his heart. Kai cries, which causes a second shard to fall out of his eye, breaking the spell. When the Snow Queen returns to the palace, Gerda rebuffs her, and the Queen simply disappears, along with her Palace. The children return home happily, meeting all those who helped them reunite along the way.

Release

Russian theatrical release 

The Snow Queen was released in Russia on 1 November 1957. The film is one of the first adaptations of the Danish fairy tale into cinematic media ever since the story was written by Andersen in New Fairy Tales. First Volume. Second Collection (1844). Previously playwright Evgeny Schwartz inspired by the Andersen's writing wrote an acclaimed children's play The Snow Queen that was staged in 1938. The era at that time was known as the Khrushchev Thaw, when the Russian people were welcoming a new post world war reconstruction that spanned all phases of life including cinema. The film was released just a few days after the Soviet Union witnessed the world's first artificial satellite Sputnik 1 that launched in October 1957.

Cold War release 

In 1959, the film was dubbed into English and released by Universal Pictures with the voices of Sandra Dee and Tommy Kirk as Gerda and Kai. The film was introduced by a six-minute live-action Christmas prologue featuring TV personality Art Linkletter, as well as a two-minute montage. In the prologue, Linkletter recited the following rhyme just before the film began: "One snowflake two/three snowflakes four/And now you'll see 'The Snow Queen'/if you add a million more." The American version also contained an entirely rewritten musical score and had three new songs in English, two of which replaced the Russian songs (the other one was in the montage). Hollywood Russian composer Joseph Gershenson composed the score for the 1959 film.

A U.S. theatrical release of a film from the Soviet Union was a revolutionary moment in the history of the Cold War due to the geopolitical tension between the countries. At this time, the United States was committed to sustaining the Cold War. Under president Eisenhower, the New Look policy advised by Secretary of State John Foster Dulles called for resistance to cultural influences from Russia. The visit by Vice President Richard Nixon and Soviet leader Nikita Khrushchev to the American National Exhibition on 24 July 1959 was supposed to lower Cold War tensions by opening cultural exchanges across the two nations, though their discussion at the exhibition became known as the Kitchen Debate. During this cultural rapprochement, leaders were aware of secret U-2 incursions into USSR airspace. Despite the Domino Theory The Snow Queen raised the iron curtain, by becoming the first purchase of a Soviet film by any major American company. M.J.P. Enterprises sold the rights of the movie to Universal for a reported fee of $30,000. It became Universal Pictures' first theatrical animated feature film. On 7 June 1959, The New York Times reported Universal's plan for a major release across Canada and the U.S. for an English  dub of the film with an added prologue. In June 1959, The Hollywood Reporter noted that, in order to allow Universal to release the picture in America, Walt Disney and Samuel Goldwyn both waived the rights they held with the MPAA to the title "The Snow Queen." The film entered the Vancouver International Film Festival on 3 August 1959 and Universal ran the picture at the San Francisco International Film Festival in November 1959.

The film's general release was initially planned for the 1959 holidays. However, Columbia's animated feature 1001 Arabian Nights was scheduled for a December release. Therefore, its wide release started in the United States on 20 November 1959.

In Washington, D.C. in April 1960, Idaho Democratic Senator Frank Church hosted an invitational screening of the film at the Motion Picture Association headquarters in Washington D.C, attended by the Ambassador of Denmark. There the film was applauded for its literary appeal to the city's many Danish residents and because its animation techniques resembled those used by Disney. With many adaptations following the release, the 1959 version is the definitive version for the 1960s audience. Many boomers from America remember the festive TV season featuring The Snow Queen.

VHS Release 
In 1985, Jim Terry produced an English dub that was released by Celebrity Home Entertainment in 1993. The theme song for the dub was provided by Bullets. The main characters Gerda and Kai's names were changed to Yvette and John. In 1998, there was a second international release that was restored and re-voiced by the company of Oleg Vidov.

In the 1990s, Jove Films restored the film and created a new English soundtrack for it, featuring the voices of Kathleen Turner, Mickey Rooney, Kirsten Dunst and Laura San Giacomo. It was shown on television in 1995 as part of the "Mikhail Baryshnikov's Stories from My Childhood series, and was later released on video and DVD in 1999. French and Spanish soundtracks were added for the DVD version, with the French soundtrack featuring Catherine Deneuve and the Spanish track featuring Beatriz Aguirre. Following criticism of the non-inclusion of the Russian soundtrack on the DVD, Jove Films also released a DVD of the film containing the original Russian soundtrack with English subtitles sometime in 2006.

Home media release

 Wendros (Sweden) - VHS - Pal - Snödrottningen (with Swedish audio)
 Films by Jove, April 27, 1999 (R0, NTSC) – version restored by Films by Jove in the 1990s. Contains English, French and Spanish soundtracks (not Russian), no subtitles. Included films: The Snow Queen, The Wild Swans, Alice and the Mystery of the Third Planet
 Krupnyy Plan, September 13, 2004 (R5, PAL) – version restored by Krupnyy Plan ("full restoration of image and sound"). Contains original Russian soundtrack, no subtitles. Included films: The Snow Queen, New Years' Eve (1948). Other features: Before and after restoration, photo album, previews. Glitch: rewinding/fast-forwarding only by chapters
 Westlake Entertainment Group, October 1, 2004 (R1, NTSC). Contains complete 1959 version of the film, but unrestored.
 Films by Jove, 2006 (R0, NTSC) – version restored by Films by Jove in the 1990s. Contains original Russian soundtrack with English subtitles. Included films: The Snow Queen, The Golden Antelope, Bench, Cyclist, Fence
 Ghibli Museum Library - December 2007 Japan - (original Russian audio, Japanese subtitles)
Soyuzmultfilm Golden Collection HD, 19 December 2020 (Russian)

Creators

Voices

Animation

Development 
Prominent Soviet artists took part in the creation of The Snow Queen film that utilized traditional hand-drawn animation. The makers of The Scarlet Flower,  and  joined to create the various settings such as the Northern German town, the Royal castle, the robber's cave and the snowy expanses of the Queen's domain into one united fairy tale film. Russian poet and children's writer Nikolay Zabolotsky wrote the poems for the soundtrack. Playwright Nikolai Erdman was one of the script writers. The fairy tale deviated slightly from Andersen's story by editing out the religious undertones as well as time-based events of the characters such as Raven's old age and the litter robber, Gerda and Kai turning into adults. However, the script is similar to Andersen's fairy tale in the utilization of the frame story. The character Ole Lukøje the dreamer narrates the story of Gerda in a Nordic town under a "slumberella." The script also narrates Gerda's quest to rescue Kai in a series of scenarios or chapters exactly as the format in the fairy tale.

Animators Alexander Vinokurov (ru) created the world of The Snow Queen, Leonid Shvartsman created the characters, while Fyodor Khitruk brought to life two characters – Ole Lukøje and the Snow Queen. The team was held in place by the direction of Lev Atamanov. Fyodor Khitruk later recalled bringing to life the character Ole Lukoye, as one of the most significant characters of the two hundred characters he animated over his many years of practice.

According to the memoirs of Leonid Shvartsman the animators found new hope for the animation industry after the Khruschev Thaw era began. Initially, they thought of drawing inspiration by going to Copenhagen in Denmark, the land where Andersen wrote New Fairy Tales. First Volume. Second Collection (1844). However the route to Western Europe and the Danish lands was closed in the mid-1950s due to the iron curtain. As an alternative, they went to Riga, Tallinn and Tartu along the Baltic states. A stay of two weeks drawing the streets and corners of the towns provided the groundwork for production of the film. The city square in the film is modeled after the city of Tallinn. From the fall of 1955 to the early summer of 1956 storyboards were prepared. It took a year and a half to complete the film. In 1956, before the release of The Snow Queen, the artists released a series of postcards of the drawings related to this event.

Character design 
The animators took a new approach to drawing the Snow Queen. They emphasized the spectral presence of the Snow Queen by using the animation technique known as rotoscoping or "éclair" named after the table manufacturer company of the same name. Éclair used an epidiascope that would be fixed on one side of a furniture equipment provided by furniture company Éclair and the screen projector was fixed on the other side. As one of the acclaimed actress of Soviet Union, Maria Babanova and a few other cast members was cinematographically filmed as if the actors are in live performance with makeup and costume. Then the film footage is transferred to celluloid with some corrections. The role of the Snow Queen would resemble the mannerisms and unique qualities of the actress as the film footage is translated into frame-by-frame drawings. Yanina Zhejmo, acclaimed actress of the Russian musical Cinderella (1947) got the role to play Gerda.

According to Leonid Shvartsman work for The Snow Queen lasted two years. The animators researched at the Lenin Library. The studio would be filled with thousands of drawings every day that had to be checked and corrected. Shvartsman explains as one of the creators of the Snow Queen, she was supposed to represent cold beauty of the ice world - "In this case, there was no prototype. I imagined a majestic, cold beauty." The character was modeled as if sculpted by stone. Additionally, Maria Babanova's voice became a fitting addition to the character the Snow Queen. The character Ole Lukøje was first based on the seven dwarfs in the film Snow White. However, Shvartsman later drew the character as a caricature of director Lev Atamanov. According to the animator, the most exciting concept about character animation is how the pencil leads the hand to different rough drafts that eventually shape into a new character.

, children's literature critic of Japan, stated the "gradations of the various blues are exquisite and beautiful" featured in the episode at the snow palace. Also Kanzaki pointed out the "movements of the people are calculated very well, especially since it is coming from a country known for classical ballet!" The animators explained the finale, when the characters Gerda and Kai set off back to their homeland on a reindeer and greet all the people is a homage by the animators to the Russian people.

Takuya Mori for the Eiga Hyouron (Film Criticism) stated The Snow Queen is similar to the films of Disney. However, the animation rebounds to new levels compared to Disney's precedent Snow White and the Seven Dwarfs. Both films employed the use of painterly backgrounds and flat planes. One way Soyuzmultfilm's The Snow Queen differs from Disney productions is through their depiction of death or elements of suffering. The insertions give The Snow Queen juxtapositions of the grotesque and the charm of an original fairy tale story. The depictions aren't intended to be disturbing. In order to emphasize the innocent nature of the film, all the antagonists including the Snow Queen are depicted as people who never become malevolent.

The animation of Lev Atamanov 

Lev Atamanov, the animation director for The Snow Queen created a new form of animation that emphasized the fairy tale qualities and artistry of animation. Rather than completely fill the frames with photo realistic representations of the world by using the rotoscoping technique known as éclair widely used by Disney, Atamanov and the Soviet animators presented the world through the lens of artistic creativity and the subtle qualities that differentiate the magical qualities of animation from the real world. The film used minimal rotoscoping only used for the Snow Queen and a few other characters. Instead the animation style emphasized creativity. Atamanov states for a fairy tale film like The Snow Queen, it is imperative to retain skazochnost''': "Animation is characterized by wide generalization, careful selection and, most importantly, grotesque exaggeration. Therein lies its power, its genuine realism. By breaking the laws of art, we inevitably slip into tired verisimilitude, which we often attempt to pass off as realism, even though it has nothing to do with either the truth of art or the truth of life."

Atamanov also is keen to retain uslovnost’ or the artistry of animation of an animation frame by focusing on the aspects of the background or characters and exploring new traits within the frame that disassociates itself from its exact representation in the world. The animators elicits emotions into the frames such as removing shadows from the faces and bringing new dimensions to the characters such as the Snow Queen's henchmen drawn in toy-like fashion.

 Awards 
The film has won many international awards including the Golden Lion at the Venice Film Festival and the animation award at the Cannes Film Festival.
 1957—Venice Film Festival: Golden Lion in the animated film category
First Prize at the International Film Festival for Children and Youth in Venice
 1958—Cannes Film Festival: First prize in the animated film category
 1958—Rome: First prize
 1958—Moscow International Film Festival: Special prize
 1959—London (Festival of festivals): Prize for best film of year
2003—International Laputa Animation Film Festival - Tokyo, Japan: 17th best Animated Film in History
2006—Komsomolskaya Pravda rating of the ten best cartoons in Russia

 Themes 
The central theme of the film is how "even an icy heart can be melted." Only the main character Gerda is capable of wielding this power of reconciliation and repentance as she roams the icy lands of the Snow Queen to save her kidnapped friend. A metaphor that relates to the theme of reconciliation is when the character robber, a short-tempered animal hunter of deer, hares, foxes meets Gerda. The little robber, amazed by Gerda's kindness, releases the girl along with the reindeer, and then frees all her captive animals.

The film juxtaposes Gerda's purity with macabre elements in two episodes where Gerda meets the magician at the garden of eternal summer and Gerda's misadventure with Mr. Corax the raven. The film's central conflict revolves around the power of love and purity solving the problem of the detachment of the soul. The conflict is described at the meeting of the characters Gerda and Kai at the snow palace, where Kai remarks at the snow polygons and states, "beautiful, they are more beautiful than real flowers!" The film's array of miracles has a finale with the last one emphasizing the theme that the power of life overcomes death.

The film delve on the power of catharsis and emotions to dissipate the troubles and challenges facing society. The emotional effects of love and tears are used as the primary tools of defense by the protagonists as Kai's tears are able to dislodge the glass splinter and Gerda's love causes the Snow Queen to flee back to the snowy lands. Furthermore, a critique from Eiga Hyouron in Japan, stated what the film lacks in comedy is supplemented by a poetic exhibition of Russian animation. The reviewer finds the film is like Russia is trying to "yearn for Spring" through the powerful effects of "single-minded love" against the snow.

 Reception 
Film critic L. Zakrzhevskaya argued that the cartoon The Snow Queen is certainly one of the best examples of world classic animation. Soviet animation director Ivan Ivanov-Vano wrote that "the film The Snow Queen is one of the masterpieces of our cartoon classics." The New York Times reviewer Bosley Crowther for the 1960 release of the film in United States was at first surprised that the film is from the Soviet Union and later is astounded by the similarity of Soyuzmultfilm's animation techniques with those of Disney studio. The review states, "To look at and listen to 'The Snow Queen,' which arrived in neighborhood theaters yesterday, you would never dream that this color cartoon feature was made in a Soviet Union studio." The reviewer reasoned that the "Russians love a hopeful fairy tale, tinged with white doves and bouncy bunny rabbits, as much as anyone at the Disney studio." The review stated the film had the same qualities as Snow White and the Seven Dwarfs film.

German review at Die Nacht der lebenden Texte stated, "Fairy tale adaptation from the Soviet Union is a beautiful old-fashioned color on the children's film shelf." Review at Fantastic Movie Musings and Ramblings, state, "This Russian animated movie version of a Hans Christian Andersen tale does that very well, and though I’ve heard that it's better in its original language, the dubbed American version is very effective." Flickers in Time review state, "This is a beautifully animated retelling of the Hans Christian Andersen fairy tale." Sabrina Crivelli of Il Cineocchio reviews stated out of all The Snow Queen adaptations, Lev Atamanov's "Soviet one remained faithful to her in plot and spirit, and details are far from indifferent." The reviewer also applauded the film's juxtapositions of the different characters including Gerda take on a spectral tone: "On the other hand, it is precisely this that makes The Snow Queen so poetic, the ability to trace through the wonderful drawings by, among others, made by the great Fyodor Khitruk; the extreme beauty – and ugliness – of the creation, the continuous contradictions that characterize human existence."

Reviewers and critics from Japan had positive reviews for the film. Takuya Mori for the Eiga Hyouron (Film Criticism) emphasized the Japanese viewpoint of the film once it released in 1960. The critique of the film in ‘The Genealogy of Soviet Animated Films: Focus on the Masterpiece The Snow Queen’ stated Mori was moved by the animation despite seeing the film in a black and white television screen: "The Snow Queen, I will daringly call it a gem – one that was first entrenched in Walt Disney, but then melted, and from which a new, single crystal was extracted. This is no longer something borrowed from America. It lacks comedic gags, and even a sense of rhythm, but this is no drawback, for gags and rhythm are not necessary to produce physiological pleasure . . . In the clear air of our neighbor to the North, the climate is harsh. But it is exactly the theme of this story that is able to melt snow with a single-minded love . . .and this because she [Russia] yearns for Spring."Ghibli Museum Library states the movie is akin to a myth: "This work, which was produced under the auspices of the Soviet government at the time and in a system unrelated to commercialism, is a solid story structure that focuses only on Gerda, the main character, by removing useless episodes, and it is also likely that the interpretation unique to Russia is projected, such as the idea of animism and reverence for nature. Even though it is a work of the previous 50 years, it still does not lose its luster."

, children's literature critic of Japan stated the film adaptation is clear and coherent along many fronts in comparison to Andersen's story: "Therefore, the story is much more consistent and clearer than the Andersen version." The detour of Gerda's original sedate personality to a courageous determined one was a new innovation that the reviewer thought, "will be the starting point for Miyazaki anime." The reviewer found the episode where Gerda encounters the bandits was an episode that clearly delineated Andersen's thought process as he wrote the fairy tale. Singer songwriter  says the film delves into philosophical narratives that is surprising for a fifty-year old Soviet film. Taniyama also stated based on animation the use of green and red colors were astounding and the animation was flowing "like waves."

Influence

 Critical response in Japan 
Shortly after the release of Snezhnaya Koroleva in Russia, the film received warm response from the Japanese audience. Released as Yuki no Joou in 1960, the film screened in Japan via film distributors tied with the Soviet Union and screened in television. An elite Japanese film journal Eiga Hyouron (Film Criticism) devoted a record fourteen pages for the film critique.

For many years the film aired on TV on New Year's holidays in Japan. Animator Hayao Miyazaki saw the film while he was at the union at Toei Animation. Hayao Miyazaki stated that this film is one of his inspirations. When he started his career, Miyazaki had a rough start and was thinking of leaving animation. When he saw The Snow Queen, it inspired him to continue working in animation.

The Soviet film is said to be Miyazaki's true inspiration for animation as Miyazaki himself claimed, "The Snow Queen is my destiny and my favorite film." According to Miyazaki, Japanese animation was starting to develop at that time period. Therefore, Miyazaki was moved by the animation techniques of The Snow Queen such as the snow swirling in the distance or waves crashing at the ice palace. Miyazaki's inspiration quotation states, "I started working as a new animator for Toei Animation in 1963, but I frankly didn't enjoy my job at all. Had I not one day seen Snedronningen (The Snow Queen) during a film screening hosted by the company labor union, I honestly doubt that I would have continued working as an animator."

In September 2007, it was announced that Studio Ghibli will be distributing The Snow Queen through their Ghibli Museum Library label and it was released in December 2007 (in the original Russian audio with Japanese subtitles). The same time Ghibli released The Snow Queen, they also released the 1976 film The Steadfast Tin Soldier by Lev Milchin. Ghibli Museum stated, "It is not an exaggeration to say that the starting point of Hayao Miyazaki is here (The Snow Queen)."

In a 2007 interview, Miyazaki stated the film's animation, story, and language greatly influenced his training and work. The symbolism and metaphors of the film particularly stood out to the animator. Miyazaki noted that the scene when Gerda goes to the barren lands to help Kai while barefoot represents the purity of Gerda's soul. Miyazaki particularly liked how the creators mixed myths and fairy tales in the film. According to Miyazaki, the story of the barefoot heroine giving up her shoes to the river is the embodiment of an ideal hero or heroine who sacrifices for other's sake. Furthermore, the animator asserts animation is animism. As a testament to this theory, Miyazaki recounts the scene in the film when the boat magically unties and floats back when Gerda gave her shoes to the river. Miyazaki concluded the interview by stating, he is working on an animated film whose character Ponyo is similar to Gerda who will be featured in the film of the same name.

In a 2021 interview Hayao Miyazaki cited The Snow Queen as an influence.

 Similarities between Soyuzmultfilm's The Snow Queen and Studio Ghibli's Princess Mononoke 

 Characters 
The 1997 Japanese award-winning film Princess Mononoke stands out as Miyazaki's version of The Snow Queen. According to research in the anthology Introducing Studio Ghibli's Monster Princess: From Mononokehime to Princess Mononoke by film historian Julia Alekseyeva, many familiar patterns are apparent between the two films. Both films try to exhibit "emotional and affective realism." Affective realism was an innovative take on animation in the twentieth century that emphasize the exhibition of emotions. Many of the characters in Princess Mononoke have an uncanny and spectral uniformity to the characters in The Snow Queen. Princess Mononoke can be seen as a tribute by Miyazaki to the Soviet Union film.Princess Mononoke, the Muromachi period epic film of young Emishi prince Ashitaka is similar to The Snow Queen by the depiction of its characters. Out of all the similarities, the eponymous character San, of Princess Mononoke stands out as the direct link to The Snow Queen. San who is depicted as a young woman who was raised by the wolves and is isolated from humans, but eventually comes to take care of the main character Ashitaka. San is a direct link to the robber girl in The Snow Queen, who is described as the warden of captured wild animals who takes care of Gerda. In terms of appearance the "short, dark hair in disarray, stern expressions, and dark eyes" of both characters as well as their mannerisms is similar to an inhabitant of the wilderness. Despite their background and unsympathetic, serious nature both characters are willing to help the protagonists.

Other similarities include the characteristics between Lady Eboshi and the Snow Queen. Both queens are drawn to be tall and their beauty is emphasized. The Snow Queen has heavily painted eyes and eyelashes and Lady Eboshi has her characteristic red lipstick. The Snow Queen's cast of female side characters such as the robber girl or the female raven represent strong-willed, steadfast, virtuous characteristics and is seen as a new aspect in twentieth century animation. Miyazaki would apply this viewpoint into his craft evidenced by the many films that feature heroines. In The Snow Queen, the arctic reindeer who carries Gerda in the Laplands is similar to Ashitaka's faithful steed, the red elk Yakul in Princess Mononoke.

 Thematic comparisons 

Thematically, both protagonists of the film, San and Gerda are characterized as stewards of nature while at the same time being human. The concept is explored in Princess Mononoke when San or Mononokehime in Japanese meaning ‘spirit princess’ can directly communicate with animals. Another similar characteristic is when Ashitaka the prince also has the ability to be in harmony with the nature's inhabitants. The concept is explored In The Snow Queen, when the film portrays Gerda as a traveler who couldn't have reached the snow palace if it weren't for her harmonious communication with all the animals of the forest such as swallows, goats, crows, doves and reindeer. The scene when she offers her shoes to the river and the river guides her to the correct path emphasizes the cognition of nature towards its hosts.

The antagonists of both films are never depicted as violent beings, but only as misguided characters. The concept is explored in The Snow Queen, when the queen keeps Kai safe in the palace. In Princess Mononoke, the concept is explored when Lady Eboshi gives care to the lepers whom she employs as gunsmiths. Both Hayao Miyazaki and Lev Atamanov shared the same vision of animation. They treated animation as a medium to move the audience based on the inherent artistry of an animation frame. They tried to unearth the skazochnost' of a frame such as a sequence in a ballet dance.

Both films depict the subtle difference between children and adults. Both directors of the films emphasize the extraordinary abilities that children have in comparison to the ordinary lifestyle of adults imposed by the rule of law and order. Gerda uses animism as a means to continue on the journey. The theme is a reference to another of Ghibli's productions, House Hunting. House Hunting the movie, follows the journeys of an ambitious preteen girl, Fuki who strolls in the Japanese wilderness. The story line of the film that describes how Fuki's childish rituals such as offerings of food and gifts to nature that converts the threatening places to friendly havens is similar to the scene in The Snow Queen where Gerda offers her shoes to the river. Both film depict nature has a tendency to connect and aid both the protagonists on their journey. Both stories highlight the sublime qualities of children behavior that otherwise would be considered unrealistic in a world of law. For a fairy tale report by Komsomolskaya Pravda, psychologist Oksana Tsevtkova states many children unlike adults perceive fairy tales such as The Snow Queen into the realm of fantasy without rationalizing the exact nature of the fairy tale into reality. Children often find the fairy tales as simply happy entertainment.

 Legacy The Snow Queen became one of the pillars in the twentieth century animation industry. According to Kino-expert, it is the most popular Soviet animation that stands alongside other legends that include Nu, Pogodi! (Well, Just You Wait!). The film was not only well received by children and adults in Russia but has also been translated into English, French, German, Italian, Spanish etc. It is arguably the most famous Soviet cartoon outside the Soviet Union. One testament to its popularity is its influence in the United States in the 1950s and 1960s. The film would air in the Christmas and new year television prime time slots.

Ballet dancer Mikhail Baryshnikov included the cartoon in his list of favorite cartoon; published in the autobiography, Stories From My Childhood. Literary critic Stas Tyrkin compiled a list of the fifteen best full-length cartoons and The Snow Queen became part of the list. Komsomolskaya Pravda rating of the ten best cartoons in Russia compiled from a survey of cinematic media website stores nominated The Snow Queen as part of its rankings. Ministry of Culture listed the film as one of fifty recommended cartoons to watch for schoolchildren.

 21st century influence 
The film's legacy is entrenched to the 21st century through its recognition at the 2003 International Laputo Animation Film Festival held in Tokyo, Japan. Over 140 animators and film critics compiled a list of the 150 best animated films of the world. The Snow Queen became the 17th best animated film with the best film being the Russian film Hedgehog in the Fog.

On 23 December 2011, the state gallery on Solyanka, Russia opened an exhibition, The Snow Queen 55-Cold and Beauty dedicated to the 55th anniversary of the release of the film and the 90th anniversary of one of its creators Alexander Vinokurov. On 6 October 2012, there was an original 35 mm film widescreen release in the cinema "Neva" in Russia. Director Lev Atamanov's daughter Anna Lvovna Atamanova attended the exhibition that included screenings of rare sketches for the cartoon. The event was organized by Big Cartoon Festival and the State Film Museum. In 2013, Big Cartoon Festival hosted sketches of the film as part of the 100th anniversary of Russian animation. The exhibition also toured Japanese cities.

In 2015, TV Magazine Russia listed the film as a classic of the USSR cinema industry. In 2020, they also compiled a list of the most famous Russian films of the twentieth century outside Russia, and The Snow Queen was on the list. In 2020, Maria Lemesheva, Editor-in-Chief and editorial director of Kinoreporter magazine compiled a list of five acclaimed cartoons for Children's Day and The Snow Queen was one of them.

In 2018, Soyuzmultfilm restored the video quality of The Snow Queen as part of its grand project to restore films from its Golden Collection. Archivists restored the film manually: carefully digitized the original tape, cleaned every frame of the celluloid dust, scratches, tears. They also used rotoscoping technology, in which characters are separated from the background for separate cleaning and restoration of all elements of the frame. Yandex partnered with Soyuzmutlfilm to apply a new Russian technology to the archive cinema reels. A neural network restoration technology was used to increase the sharpness and resolution of the frames. The film stock were renewed with all the film grain and extra flickering dots removed. The side by side comparison of a frame of The Snow Queen was shown. The restored Golden Collection films including The Snow Queen was released to the theaters on 5 December 2020. The HD revival screenings are distributed by United Network "Cinema Park."

Russia honored the People's Artist of Russia animator for the film, Leonid Shvartsman on 30 August 2020 on his 100th year birthday milestone. Interviews from TASS as well as Kino Teatr gave the readers insight into the history of the animator whose work not only spans The Snow Queen but also the Cheburashka. Shvartsman explained that he is pleased by the popularity of The Snow Queen in audiences to this day. With the support of the Ministry of Culture an exhibition dedicated to the centenary of the animator, opened in Saint Petersburg at the Berthold Center on 28 November 2020.

 Note 

 See also 
 History of Russian animation
 List of animated feature films of the 1950s
 The Snow Queen (1967 film) Frozen (2013 film) Disney film inspired by The Snow Queen References 

 Literature 

 

 External links 
The entire 1957 film on Soyuzmultfilm's official YouTube channel (in Russian)
The Snow Queen at Animator.ru

 (The Snow Queen was one of the episodes)
Article about 1959 American versionThe Snow Queen in archived The New York Times review by Bosley Crowther, one of the first American reviews of a Russian animated film
The Snow Queen at the Big Cartoon Database
The Snow Queen (Снежная королева) - cartoon online in English and Russian with subtitles at Soviet Cartoons OnlineThe Snow Queen(1959)'' - Sandra Dee and other voice actors at the backstage
 in English

1957 animated films
1957 films
Soyuzmultfilm
Films based on The Snow Queen
Films directed by Lev Atamanov
Films scored by Frank Skinner
Russian independent films
Soviet animated films
Universal Pictures films
Universal Pictures animated films
Russian children's fantasy films
1950s Russian-language films
Soviet Christmas films
1950s Christmas films
Rotoscoped films
Russian animated feature films
Animated films based on children's books
Animated films based on literature
Animated films about friendship
1950s children's animated films
1950s fantasy films
1950s children's adventure films
Films set in palaces
Films set in Scandinavia
Russian animated fantasy films
1950s American films
Soviet children's films